The 2008 Oceania Youth Athletics Championships were held at the Oleai Sports Complex in Saipan, Northern Mariana Islands, between June 25–28, 2008. They were held together with the 2008 Oceania Open Championships.
A total of 37 events were contested, 19 by boys and 18 by girls.

Medal summary
Complete results can be found on the websites of the Oceania Athletics Association, and of the World Junior Athletics History.

Boys under 18 (Youth)

Girls under 18 (Youth)

Mixed

Medal table (unofficial)

Participation (unofficial)
An unofficial count yields the number of about 112 athletes from 21 countries:

 (6)
 (12)
 (4)
 (1)
 (3)
 (15)
 (1)
 (4)
 (1)
 (4)
/ (1)
 (18)
 (2)
 (14)
 (4)
 (6)
 (3)
 (4)
 (4)
 (3)
 (2)

References

Oceania Youth Athletics Championships
Athletics in the Northern Mariana Islands
Oceania Youth
2008 in Northern Mariana Islands sports
International sports competitions hosted by the Northern Mariana Islands
2008 in youth sport
June 2008 sports events in Oceania